The Sensual Sound of Sonny Stitt is an album by saxophonist Sonny Stitt performing with Ralph Burns' orchestra  recorded in 1961 and released on the Verve label.

Reception
The Allmusic site awarded the album 3 stars.

Track listing 
All compositions by Sonny Stitt except as indicated
 "Try a Little Tenderness" (Jimmy Campbell, Reg Connelly, Harry M. Woods) - 3:21   
 "Back to My Home Town" - 3:16   
 "All of You" (Cole Porter) - 3:37   
 "I Never Felt That Way" - 3:08  
 "World Really Isn't" - 2:55   
 "They Say It's Wonderful" (Irving Berlin) - 3:18   
 "Time After Time" (Sammy Cahn, Jule Styne) - 3:48   
"I Love You"  (Cole Porter) - 3:08   
 "Once in a While" (Michael Edwards, Bud Green) - 3:31   
 "Talk to Me" (Stanley Kahan, Eddie Snyder, Rudy Vallée) - 3:11

Personnel 
Sonny Stitt - alto saxophone
The Ralph Burns Strings - strings
Orchestra arranged and conducted by Ralph Burns
Murray Laden - cover photography

References 

1961 albums
Verve Records albums
Sonny Stitt albums
albums arranged by Ralph Burns
albums conducted by Ralph Burns